Marcel Ziegl (born 20 December 1992) is an Austrian professional footballer who plays as a midfielder for Austrian Football Bundesliga club SV Ried.

External links

1992 births
Living people
Austrian footballers
Association football midfielders
Austrian Football Bundesliga players
SV Ried players
Austria youth international footballers
Austria under-21 international footballers